Lévis is a provincial electoral district in the Chaudière-Appalaches region of Quebec, Canada. It includes all of the city of Lévis north of Autoroute 20 and east of the Chaudière River. This includes downtown Lévis, Lauzon, Saint-David-de-l'Auberivière and Saint-Romuald.

It was created for the 1867 election (and an electoral district of that name existed earlier in the Legislative Assembly of the Province of Canada).

Members of the Legislative Assembly / National Assembly

Election results

^ Change is from redistributed results. CAQ change is from ADQ.

|-
 
|Liberal
|Carole Théberge
|align="right"|9,925
|align="right"|25.19
|align="right"| -9.92
|-

|-

|-

^ Quebec solidaire change is from UFP

|-
 
|Liberal
|Carole Théberge
|align="right"|12,891
|align="right"|35.12
|align="right"|-0.05

|-

References

External links
Information
 Elections Quebec

Election results
 Election results (National Assembly)
 Election results (QuébecPolitique)

Maps
 2011 map (PDF)
 2001 map (Flash)
2001–2011 changes (Flash)
1992–2001 changes (Flash)
 Electoral map of Chaudière-Appalaches region
 Quebec electoral map, 2011

Politics of Lévis, Quebec
Quebec provincial electoral districts